Daryl Lafayette Jones (born May 31, 1955) is a Democratic politician from Miami, Florida, United States.

Early years 
The son of public school teachers, Jones was born in Jackson, Mississippi, the oldest of four children. He attended Lanier High School where he was elected President of the Mississippi State Association of Student Councils and in 1973, graduated valedictorian. Daryl subsequently attended the United States Air Force Academy, where he was the middleweight boxing champion, cadet vice wing commander and a 1977 honor graduate majoring in mathematics. He is the first African-American graduate of a military academy from Mississippi. He has one sister and two brothers.

Military career 
Lt. Jones became an F-4E pilot in the United States Air Force. He was transferred to the 90th Tactical Fighter Squadron at Clark AB in The Philippines, and became flight leader and mission commander in Team Spirit and Cope Thunder exercises. In 1981, Capt. Jones arrived at Homestead AFB, FL, as an  F-4 Phantom ll instructor pilot, twice named the 31st TTS Outstanding Instructor Pilot and 6 consecutive classes of student pilots named him their Outstanding Instructor Pilot. Jones left active Air Force duty in 1984 and enrolled at the University of Miami School of Law. The university awarded Daryl its highest honor, the Iron Arrow. He graduated cum laude in 1987 after serving as president of both the Student Bar and National Bar Associations. Jones worked as a federal judicial clerk for Judge Peter Fay in the 11th circuit court of appeals, then as an Assistant Dade County Attorney at Miami International Airport. He joined the Puerto Rico Air National Guard as an A-7D Corsair ll fighter pilot. In 1989, Captain Jones transferred to the U.S. Air Force Reserve at Homestead AFB and became an F-16 Falcon fighter pilot. He rose to the rank of colonel as an Air Force Reservist.

Political career 
Jones was elected  to the Florida House of Representatives in 1990. After his first session, the Miami Herald named him Freshman  Representative of The Year. On August 24, 1992, Hurricane Andrew devastated Representative Jones' House District while he was in the midst of a campaign for the State Senate.

From 1992 to 2002, he served in the Florida Senate. Senator Jones' immediately went to work, sponsoring the Hurricane Andrew Trust Fund Bill, which appropriated more than $650 million over four years to help rebuild the devastated area. South Dade County largely recovered in only four years. Senator Jones also sponsored and passed the Rosewood Bill, the only legislation in American history to grant reparations to African Americans. Uniquely qualified as an Air Force Officer, Lawyer and Statesman, during the 90s, Senator Jones successfully defended the existence of Homestead AFB before 2 Realignment and Closure Commission Boards. In 1995, Senator Jones was elected Democratic Senate President-designate. The next year, President Clinton appointed Senator Jones to the U.S. Air Force Academy Board of Visitors].
In 1998 he was President Bill Clinton's choice to be Secretary of the Air Force but was not confirmed.

In 2002, Jones was the first African-American to run for Governor of Florida.

On September 14, 2006, he was chosen as a nominee for the position of Lieutenant Governor of Florida by gubernatorial candidate Jim Davis.

Personal 
Jones currently resides in Miami. He has three children: Derek, Durel, and Michele. He has spent the past several years running his own real estate investment and consulting firm, D.L. Jones & Associates and is president of The Law Offices of Daryl L. Jones, P.A., a law firm specializing in foreclosure defense and loan modifications.

References

1955 births
Democratic Party Florida state senators
Living people
Democratic Party members of the Florida House of Representatives
United States Air Force Academy alumni
University of Miami School of Law alumni
United States Air Force officers
United States Air Force reservists
20th-century American politicians
21st-century American politicians
Candidates in the 2002 United States elections
Candidates in the 2006 United States elections